Molodaya Gvardia (tr. Moloda Hvardiya) is a Ukrainian junior ice hockey team based in Donetsk. The team is an affiliate of the Kontinental Hockey League's HC Donbass, and is a member of the Minor Hockey League (MHL), joining in the 2013–14 season. They are the sole representative from Ukraine competing at the major-junior level. Borys Kolesnikov, a prominent Ukrainian politician and businessman, owns the organization. The team takes its name from the World War II Soviet resistance group the Young Guard, who consisted mainly of local youths and also operated in the Donbass region.

History
On April 2, 2013, HC Donbass announced official negotiations had taken place regarding the inclusion of a Ukrainian minor hockey team in the KHL's Minor Hockey League system for the 2013–14 season. Ukrainian former NHL player Alexander Godynyuk was named head coach on a three-year contract. The team's name and logo were chosen by a 45% popular vote among fans, with finalist names being the 'Donetsk Scythians', and 'Donbass Flames'. On June 19, 2013, the team officially joined the MHL.

References

External links
 Official website
 Elite Prospects page

Ice hockey teams in Ukraine
Sport in Donetsk
Ice hockey clubs established in 2013
Junior Hockey League (Russia) teams
HC Donbass